Master Ma is a 1998 Hong Kong-Taiwanese two-season television series produced by the television stations ATV and CTV. It is loosely based on the life of Ma Yongzhen, a Hui Chinese martial artist who lived during the late Qing dynasty. The series was directed by Fan Sau-ming and starred Kenny Ho as the eponymous character.

Plot

Season 1 
The series is set in the Warlord Era of early 20th-century China. Ma Yongzhen and his mother, Ma Daniang, live in Shandong Province, where they raise horses for Marshal Duan's army. One night, the stables mysteriously catch fire and the horses are lost. The marshal's men arrest Ma Yongzhen and his mother and prepare to execute them for their negligence. However, Ma Yongzhen and his mother fight their way out of the prison and escape to a safe location. Ma Yongzhen later makes his way alone to Shanghai to earn a new living.

In Shanghai, Ma Yongzhen becomes famous after winning a horse race and a martial arts tournament. However, he also gets into trouble with the two most powerful gangs in Shanghai: the White Gang led by Bai Laili and the Wuhu Gang led by Xue Changchun. At the same time, he starts a romance with Xue Changchun's mistress, the opera singer Liu Juchi, but has no chance to be with her. With the help of Duan Lengcui and others, Ma Yongzhen forms the Zhendong Gang to help the poor and fight injustice, unlike the other gangs. At the end of Season 1, Ma Yongzhen and his Zhendong Gang destroy the Wuhu Gang and make an uneasy peace with the White Gang.

Season 2 
Season 2 revolves around a rivalry between Ma Yongzhen and Bai Laili. Bai Laili resorts to various cunning means in his attempt to destroy Ma Yongzhen and the Zhendong Gang. First, he sends his men to infiltrate the Zhendong Gang and steal a shipment of foreign goods stored in their warehouses. Next, he orders his henchman Tang Biao to assassinate the French consul and frame Ma Yongzhen for the murder. Eventually, with the help of Duan Lengcui's father, who turns out to be Marshal Duan, Ma Yongzhen succeeds in clearing his name and solving the problems. With Marshal Duan to back him up, Ma Yongzhen manages to keep Bai Laili and the White Gang at bay for some time.

At the same time, Ma Yongzhen's feelings for Liu Juchi gradually diminish as he becomes more romantically attracted to Duan Lengcui and they are eventually engaged. Marshal Duan and the Japanese consul convince Ma Yongzhen to support them in opening a hospital to provide medical services for the poor in Shanghai and improve Sino-Japanese ties. However, Ma Yongzhen and his friends later discover that Marshal Duan is secretly collaborating with the Japanese to develop biological weapons in the hospital. In return, the Japanese will aid the marshal in defeating the Kuomintang government. At the same time, Ma Yongzhen encounters Kimura, a hostile Japanese karateka on Bai Laili's side who constantly makes trouble for him.

Cast 
 Kenny Ho as Ma Yongzhen, the protagonist and the boss of the Zhendong Gang.
 Grace Yu as Liu Juchi, an opera singer who is also Xue Changchun's mistress and Ma Yongzhen's first love interest.
 Anita Lee as Duan Lengcui, Marshal Duan's daughter and Ma Yongzhen's second love interest.
 Cheng Pei-pei as Ma Daniang, Ma Yongzhen's mother.
 Chan Hung-lit as Bai Laili, the boss of the White Gang.
 Norman Chui as Xue Changchun, the boss of the Wuhu Gang.
 Fan Bingbing as Bai Xiaodie, Bai Laili's daughter. At the end of Season 2, she is revealed to be Ma Yongzhen's long-lost younger sister, Ma Suzhen, who has been adopted by Bai Laili.
 Howie Huang as Sun Jisheng, a doctor and Kuomintang spy. He is Bai Xiaodie's lover.
 Yang Sheng as Jiang Shiguang, a policeman in Shanghai who befriends Ma Yongzhen. He is promoted to Deputy Chief Inspector later.
 Lin Jing as Wenjing, a news journalist and Jiang Shiguang's love interest.
 Cheng Sihan as Lu Kuangtian, a warlord who takes control of Shanghai in Season 1.
 Lung Tien-hsiang as Tang Biao, Bai Laili's right-hand man.
 He Zhonghua as Luo Zhan, one of Xue Changchun's henchman. At the end of Season 1, he falls off a cliff during the battle between the Wuhu Gang and Zhendong Gang and is believed to be dead. However, in Season 2, it is revealed that he was saved by Sun Jisheng and has become a Kuomintang spy to help Sun Jisheng in gathering intelligence in Shanghai.
 Chang Chen-huan as Duan Tianfeng, a warlord who takes control of Shanghai in Season 2.
 Mondi Yau as Chen Jiamei, a Japanese spy in disguise as a courtesan. She becomes Bai Laili's mistress.
 Shen Meng-sheng as Ding Xianjin, the son of a wealthy businessman who uses his family fortune to start a drama troupe to provide free entertainment to the poor. He falls in love with Liu Juchi.
 Kou Zhanwen as Kimura, a ruthless and overbearing Japanese karateka.

Remake
The series was remade in 2012 as a mainland Chinese television series titled Ma Yongzhen, directed by Kuk Kwok-leung and starring Danny Chan as Ma Yongzhen. Norman Chu and He Zhonghua are cast in the remake as Bai Laili and Xue Changchun respectively.

See also
 Boxer from Shantung, a 1972 Hong Kong film based on the life of Ma Yongzhen.

1998 Hong Kong television series debuts
1998 Hong Kong television series endings
Asia Television original programming
Taiwanese television series